GSP Prometeu is a jackup independent leg cantilever drilling rig operated by GSP Drilling, a Grup Servicii Petroliere subsidiary, and currently contracted by Melrose Resources for drilling in the Bulgarian section of the Black Sea. The drilling unit is registered in Malta.

Description
GSP Prometeu drilling rig was designed by Sonnat Offshore and was built by Petrom at the Galaţi Shipyard in 1982. The rig was completely reconstructed and refurbished in 2003 at a cost of US$35 million. The rig was owned and operated by Petrom from 1982 to 2005 when the company sold its six offshore platforms (including Atlas, Jupiter, Orizont, Prometeu and Saturn) to Grup Servicii Petroliere for US$100 million.

As a drilling rig, GSP Prometeu is equipped with advanced drilling equipment and has to meet strict levels of certification under international law. GSP Prometeu is able to maneuver with its own engines (to counter drift and ocean currents), but for long-distance relocation it must be moved by specialist tugboats. The rig is capable of withstanding severe sea conditions including  waves and  winds.

Operations
Currently the GSP Prometeu is operated by the British company Melrose Resources which uses the drilling rig at its Black Sea oil and natural gas prospects. The rig is set to drill for natural gas in the Kaliakra 2 prospect.

References

External links
Official website

1984 ships
Jack-up rigs
Semi-submersibles
Ships built in Romania